11th Armored may refer to:

11th Armoured Brigade (United Kingdom) 
11th Armoured Division (United Kingdom) 
11th Armored Cavalry Regiment (United States)
11th Armored Division (United States)
11th Armoured Cavalry Division (Poland)

See also
11th Army (disambiguation)
XI Corps (disambiguation)
11th Division (disambiguation)
11th Group (disambiguation)
11th Brigade (disambiguation)
11th Regiment (disambiguation)
11th Battalion (disambiguation)
11 Squadron (disambiguation)